Garfield County is a county located in the U.S. state of Montana. As of the 2020 census, the population was 1,173. Its county seat is Jordan.

Garfield County is noteworthy as the site of the discovery and excavation of four of the world's dozen or so major specimens (as of 1994) of Tyrannosaurus rex. A cast of the skull of one of these dinosaurs is on display at the Garfield County Museum.

Geography
Its average population density of 0.1058 inhabitants/km2 (0.274/sq mi) is the third-lowest of any county outside of Alaska (behind Loving County, Texas and Esmeralda County, Nevada).

Major highways

 Montana Highway 22
  Montana Highway 59
  Montana Highway 24
  Montana Highway 200

Adjacent counties

 Phillips County – northwest
 Valley County – north
 McCone County – east
 Prairie County – east
 Custer County – southeast
 Rosebud County – south
 Petroleum County – west

National protected area
 Charles M. Russell National Wildlife Refuge (part)

Demographics

2000 census
As of the 2000 census, there were 1,279 people, 532 households, and 366 families living in the county. The population density was <1/km2 (<1/sq mi). There were 961 housing units at an average density of <1/km2 (<1/sq mi). The racial makeup of the county was 99.14% White, 0.08% Black or African American, 0.39% Native American, 0.08% Asian, 0.08% Pacific Islander, and 0.23% from two or more races.  0.39% of the population were Hispanic or Latino of any race. 25.9% were of German, 15.4% English, 14.4% American, 8.1% Scottish, 8.1% Irish, 6.7% Norwegian and 5.5% Scots-Irish ancestry.

There were 532 households, out of which 28.80% had children under the age of 18 living with them, 60.30% were married couples living together, 4.50% had a female householder with no husband present, and 31.20% were non-families. 28.20% of all households were made up of individuals, and 13.50% had someone living alone who was 65 years of age or older. The average household size was 2.38 and the average family size was 2.93.

The county population contained 24.50% under the age of 18, 7.10% from 18 to 24, 23.30% from 25 to 44, 25.80% from 45 to 64, and 19.30% who were 65 years of age or older. The median age was 42 years. For every 100 females, there were 106.60 males. For every 100 females age 18 and over, there were 103.40 males.

The median income for a household in the county was $25,917, and the median income for a family was $31,111. Males had a median income of $20,474 versus $14,531 for females. The per capita income for the county was $13,930. About 16.70% of families and 21.50% of the population were below the poverty line, including 27.90% of those under age 18 and 17.40% of those age 65 or over.

2010 census
As of the 2010 census, there were 1,206 people, 532 households, and 347 families living in the county. The racial makeup of the county was 98.6% white, 0.4% American Indian, 0.2% black or African American, 0.1% Asian, 0.2% from other races, and 0.5% from two or more races. Those of Hispanic or Latino origin made up 0.2% of the population. In terms of ancestry, 33.3% were German, 16.9% were Irish, 15.0% were Norwegian, 13.3% were English, 10.5% were American, 8.1% were Swedish, and 7.4% were Scottish.

Of the 532 households, 22.6% had children under the age of 18 living with them, 57.0% were married couples living together, 5.1% had a female householder with no husband present, 34.8% were non-families, and 30.3% of all households were made up of individuals. The average household size was 2.27 and the average family size was 2.86. The median age was 46.4 years.

The median income for a household in the county was $42,955 and the median income for a family was $54,375. Males had a median income of $37,813 versus $19,286 for females. The per capita income for the county was $22,424. About 8.1% of families and 10.7% of the population were below the poverty line, including 16.1% of those under age 18 and 8.9% of those age 65 or over.

Politics
Like all of the High Plains outside of Native American counties, Garfield is an overwhelmingly Republican county. It has been the most Republican county in Montana since the 2004 United States presidential election.

The last Democratic presidential candidate to carry the county was Franklin D. Roosevelt in 1940, and in the last seven Presidential elections no Democratic candidate has managed to receive more than 15.1 percent. The last Democrat to pass so much as thirty percent was Lyndon Johnson during his 1964 landslide win over Barry Goldwater, and even then Goldwater won the county by double digits and it was his second-best county in the Treasure State behind Powder River.

In the 2000 presidential election Republican George W. Bush won 89% of the vote to Democrat Al Gore's 7%. In the 2004 presidential election, Garfield County gave 92.08% of its votes to President George W. Bush, with John Kerry receiving 6.21% of the vote. In the 2008 presidential election, Senator John McCain received 87.2% with Senator Barack Obama receiving 9.1%. In the 2012 presidential election, Governor Mitt Romney received 90.2% of the vote with President Barack Obama receiving only 6.4% of the vote. In the 2016 presidential election, Donald Trump received 91.00% of the vote while Hillary Clinton got 4.75% of the vote. Trump's showing of 94% in the 2020 election is the strongest for any candidate in the county's history.

Garfield County is also Republican at the local level. Democratic governor Brian Schweitzer never received more than 28 percent of the county's vote and no Democratic gubernatorial candidate has carried the county since Ted Schwinden in 1984. As part of the 15th district of the Montana Senate, the county is represented by Republican Jim Peterson and as part of the 30th district of the Montana House of Representatives it is represented by Republican Dave Kasten.

Communities

Town
 Jordan (county seat)

Unincorporated communities

 Benzien
 Big Dry
 Brusett
 Cohagen
 Haxby
 Hillside
 Mosby
 Sand Springs
 Tindall

See also
 List of lakes in Garfield County, Montana
 List of mountains in Garfield County, Montana
 National Register of Historic Places listings in Garfield County MT

References

External links
 Garfield County, MT

 
1919 establishments in Montana
Populated places established in 1919